The Guatemala national futsal team represents Guatemala in international futsal competitions, such as the World Cup and the CONCACAF Championships, and is governed by the Federación Nacional de Fútbol. In March 2015, the Futsal league, as well as the federation, formed their own body headed by Gerardo Paiz as head of Guatemalan Futsal. Paiz has provided Guatemala with many victories and titles in the last decade. Many believe that his leadership and isolation from the Federación Nacional de Fútbol, a group that most Guatemalans associate with corruption, has benefited futsal in the country.

The Guatemalan futsal team was the host team of the FIFA Futsal World Cup in 2000 when it was held in Guatemala. It was the 4th Futsal World Cup held under FIFA. This world event launched the national squad and is seen as what catapulted Guatemala in the sport.

The Guatemalan team has participated in four FIFA Futsal World Cups.

Guatemala was the CONCACAF champion in 2008. Their home games are held in the Domo Polideportivo in Zone 13 in Guatemala City. Their best match was a 10–1 victory over China at the 2008 FIFA Futsal World Cup. Currently, the squad is ranked 27th in the world, 7th in the American continent and 3rd in CONCACAF. In late February, it was announced that Spaniard and experienced Tomas De Dios Lopez would become the new national head coach. Days later, in a press conference, the news were made official as well as a new kit deal with Joma that replaced Umbro. The Spaniard has a contract until the end of the 2016 FIFA Futsal World Cup in Colombia.

Results and fixtures

The following is a list of match results in the last 12 months, as well as any future matches that have been scheduled.
Legend

2021

Competitive record

FIFA Futsal World Cup

CONCACAF Futsal Championship
1996 - 4th place (host)
2000 - Did not qualify
2004 - Did not enter
2008 -  Champions (host)
2012 -  2nd place (host)
2016 -  3rd place
2021 -  3rd place

Grand Prix de Futsal
2005 – Did not enter
2006 – Did not enter
2007 – Did not enter
2008 – Did not enter
2009 – 7th place
2010 – 11th place
2011 – 5th place
2013 – 6th place
2014 – 4th place
2015 – 6th place
2017 – TBD

Futsal Confederations Cup
2009 – 4th place
2013 – Did not enter
2014 – 8th place

Futsal at the Pan American Games
2007 – 7th place

References

Guatemala
National
Futsal